Tedi may refer to:

Acronyms 

 Trans-European Drug Information (TEDI)

People 
 Tedi Thurman, American model and actress (d. 2012)
 Tedi Sarafian, American screenwriter
 Tedi Cara, Albanian professional football player
 Tedi Moskov, Bulgarian film director

Media 

 Tedi Medi Family, Indian sitcom television series